NIN is a weekly conservative news magazine published in Belgrade, Serbia. Its name is an acronym for Nedeljne informativne novine (Недељне информативне новине) which roughly translates into Weekly Informational Newspaper.

Though a current events magazine in its essence, NIN also earned an esteemed reputation due to a long tradition of opening its pages to the best and the brightest within Serbian, and previously Yugoslav society, whether in arts, sciences, or even sports. This reputation has recently somewhat been tarnished as the magazine was forced into commercial competition with numerous political periodicals that sprung up in Serbia after the dissolution of Yugoslavia. Since then, NIN has adopted a slightly more populist tone, though it is still highly regarded.

, the magazine had 35 employees.

In July 2008, the magazine celebrated the release of its 3000th issue. On March 13, 2009 it was announced that majority stake in the magazine was bought by Swiss media company Ringier AG.

History
NIN was originally started in 1935. During the late 1980s Slobodan Milošević and his followers converted major publications, including NIN, into media outlets of Serbian nationalism.

2009 sale
In 2007 NIN was preparing for privatization. At that time the magazine's ownership structure was: 87% publicly owned (društveni kapital), 10% owned by Politika AD, and 3% owned by the employees. A 60.9% stake (70% of the public stake) in the magazine was to be auctioned off on September 29, 2007 with starting price set at RSD13.2 million (~ €170,000). However, the auction as the method of privatization for the magazine was scrapped by the Serbian Privatization Agency due to employee demands and a new tender was set for sometime during spring 2008.

The tender was actually opened on October 30, 2008 and it closed on December 19, 2008. On December 25, 2008, it was reported that companies Ringier AG and Novosti AD submitted competing offers for 61.48% stake in NIN (70% of the magazine's public stake, which is in turn 87% of the total stake).

In mid March 2009, it was announced that Ringier AG bought the majority stake in NIN for RSD57.455 million (~ €810,000). Soon afterward the magazine's headquarters moved from Cetinjska Street to Kraljice Marije Street at the same location where Blic daily (Ringier's other major asset in Serbia) has its headquarters. Sometime in April 2009, longtime editor-in-chief Slobodan Reljić was let go and replaced with Srđan Radulović, up to that point an editor at Blic daily. The change was done quietly without any press releases.

In September 2009, an open letter written by the magazine's longtime journalists to Ringier AG chairman Michael Ringier surfaced in which they are criticizing some of the moves and changes since Ringier took over.

The NIN Literary Award
In January every year, NINs special jury vote on what they feel was the best novel released during the previous year and award it with Ninova nagrada (Нинова награда, the NIN Prize), which has over the years become one of the highest honours for contemporary Serbian authors. The award is also very relevant commercially as its recipients usually go on to become bestsellers.

Editors
The list of individuals who performed editor-in-chief duties at NIN.
Milan Ćulibrk     May 2013 – Present
Nebojša Spaić     October 2010 – May 2013
Veselin Simonović ( acting editor-in-chief ) April 2010 – September 2010 
Srđan Radulović   August 2009 – March 2010
Slobodan Reljić   October 2002 – July 2009
Stevan Nikšić     August 1998 – September 2002 
Milivoje Glišić   March 1998 – August 1998 
Dušan Veličković  March 1994 – February 1997
Milo Gligorijević
Velizar Zečević
Teodor Anđelić
Mirko Đekić
Slava Đukić
Dušan Simić
Dragan Marković
Dragokjub Milivojević Uča
Frano Babieri
Đorđe Radenković
Stevan Majstorović
Najdan Pašić
Veselin Masleša

References

External links
Official Site

Communist magazines
Eastern Bloc mass media
Magazines established in 1935
Mass media in Belgrade
Magazines published in Serbia
Serbian-language magazines
Weekly news magazines
Magazines published in Yugoslavia